The Rolls-Royce Hawk was a British aero engine designed by Rolls-Royce in 1915. Derived from one bank of six cylinders of the Rolls-Royce Eagle, it produced 75 horsepower at 1,370 rpm. Power was progressively increased to 91 hp by February 1916, and 105 hp by October 1918.

After Rolls-Royce made the prototypes, the Hawk was manufactured under licence by Brazil Straker in Bristol between 1915 and 1918. During this period 204 engines were built, and the Hawk earned a reputation for high reliability.

Many engines of this type were used to power the SSZ class coastal patrol airships of which 76 were built.

Applications
Avro 504F
Farman MF.7
Royal Aircraft Factory B.E.2
SS class blimp (1 example)
SSP class blimp
SSZ class blimp
SST class blimp

Post war one engine (serial number 332) was fitted into a specially built hull and launched on Windermere in 1922 with the name Canfly.  With a flywheel added it was directly connected to the boat's propeller without a gearbox. Capable of reaching speeds of  Canfly was used as the official's boat at several world speed record attempts during the 1920s and 1930s.  The boat and engine are now displayed in a working but non-operational state at the Windermere Jetty museum.

Specifications (Hawk I)

See also

References

Notes

Bibliography

Flight 7 May 1954
British Airships
Lumsden, Alec. British Piston Engines and their Aircraft. Marlborough, Wiltshire: Airlife Publishing, 2003. .
 Pugh, Peter. The Magic of a Name – The Rolls-Royce Story: The First 40 Years. Duxford, Cambridge: Icon Books, 2001. .
 Taulbut, Derek S. Eagle – Henry Royce’s First Aero Engine, Rolls-Royce Heritage Trust, 2011. .

External links 

 RR-Hawk at Shuttleworth Collection in the UK
 RR-Hawk at USAF museum

Hawk
1910s aircraft piston engines
Airship engines